Oraal Koodi Kallanaayi is a 1964 Indian Malayalam-language film, directed and produced by P. A. Thomas and Manneth David. The film stars Prem Nazir, Sheela, Adoor Bhasi and Thikkurissy Sukumaran Nair. The film had musical score by K. V. Job.

Cast
 
Prem Nazir as Prabhakaran
 V.C Ahammadunni (Ex MP) 
Sheela  as Aysha
Adoor Bhasi as Panikkar
Thikkurissy Sukumaran Nair 
Jeevan Prakash
Pappukutty Bhagavathar 
P. J. Antony 
P. A. Thomas as Beeran
J. Sasikumar 
T. S. Muthaiah as Govindhan
Prathapachandran 
Alleppey Vincent 
Ambika as Devaki Teacher
Devaki 
Gemini Chandra
 K.S Parvathi
 Ravi
 Master Jithendran
Gemini Ganesan 
J. A. R. Anand 
Kushalakumari
Manikyam
Murali as Shekaran Master
Panjabi
Pankajavalli 
S. P. Pillai as Manak Kammath
V. S. Achari
 Govind Paliyat
 Jose
 Hariram
 Hashim 
 Aravindan
 Krishnan
 Gopi
 Kipson
 Raman
 Madhavan

Soundtrack
The music was composed by K. V. Job with lyrics by Sreemoolanagaram Vijayan, Abhayadev and G. Sankara Kurup.

References

External links
 

1964 films
1960s Malayalam-language films